Mallow or mallows may refer to:

Nature
Malvaceae, a family  of plants; in particular the following genera:
 Abelmoschus, a genus of about fifteen species of flowering plants
 Althaea (plant), marsh mallow
 Callirhoe (plant), poppy mallow
 Corchorus, mallow, molokia, mlukhia
 Eremalche, flowering plants endemic to the US desert southwest
 Hibiscus, rosemallow
 Kosteletzkya, seashore mallow
 Lavatera, tree mallow or rose mallow
 Malacothamnus, bush-mallow
 Malva, mallow
 Malvaviscus, Turk's cap mallow, wax mallow
 Sidalcea, Greek mallow, chequer-mallow
 Sphaeralcea, globemallow
Insects:
 Larentia clavaria, mallow, species of moth
 Mallow skipper, butterfly

Places
 Mallow, Alberta, a locality in Alberta, Canada
 Mallow, County Cork, a town in the Republic of Ireland
 Mallow (Parliament of Ireland constituency), 1613–1800
 Mallow (UK Parliament constituency), 1801–1885
 Mallow GAA, a Gaelic football and hurling club
 Mallow railway station
 Mallow, Iran, a village in Razavi Khorasan Province, Iran
 Mallow, Virginia, United States
 Mallows Bay, Maryland, United States
 The Mallows, a historic home located at Head of the Harbor in Suffolk County, New York

People
 Dave Mallow (born 1948), U.S. voice actor, also known as Colin Phillips
 Johannes Mallow (born 1981), German memory-sports competitor
 Charles Edward Mallows (1864–1915), English architect and landscape architect
 Colin Lingwood Mallows (born 1930), English statistician

Arts, entertainment, and media

Fictional characters
 Mallow, cook and one of the Trial Captains of Akala Island in Pokémon Sun & Moon
 Hober Mallow, character in the Foundation series of novels of Isaac Asimov
 Prince Mallow, a playable cloud-like character in Super Mario RPG, a 1996 adventure/console role-playing game

Other uses in arts, entertainment, and media
 Mallows, a toy line by Shocker Toys
 "Rakes of Mallow", a traditional Irish song and polka

Transportation
 Beriev Be-10, Soviet jet-engined flying boat (NATO reporting name "Mallow")
 HMS Mallow
  (later HMAS Mallow), sloop launched in 1915
 , corvette from World War II

Other uses
 Mauve (also known as mallow), a color
 Mallows's Cp, in statistics, a stopping rule for stepwise regression
 Malvi language, or Mallow, the language of the Malwa region of India
 Marshmallow, a sweet originally made from the marsh mallow

See also
 Mallo (disambiguation)
 Mallos (disambiguation)
 Malov, a surname
 Malloué, a commune in Calvados department, France